Paein Koola (also Romanized as Pā’īn Kūlā; also known as Pā’īn Koolā) is a village in Kolijan Rostaq-e Sofla Rural District, in the Central District of Sari County, Mazandaran Province, Iran. At the 2006 census, its population was 589, in 162 families.

References 

Populated places in Sari County